Cropping is the removal of unwanted outer areas from a photographic or illustrated image. The process usually consists of the removal of some of the peripheral areas of an image to remove extraneous trash from the picture, to improve its framing, to change the aspect ratio, or to accentuate or isolate the subject matter from its background. Depending on the application, this can be performed on a physical photograph, artwork, or film footage, or it can be achieved digitally by using image editing software. The process of cropping is common to the photographic, film processing, broadcasting, graphic design, and printing businesses.

In photography, print, and design 

In the printing, graphic design and photography industries, cropping is the removal of unwanted areas from the periphery of a photographic or illustrated image. Cropping is one of the most basic photo manipulation processes, and it is carried out to remove an unwanted object or irrelevant noise from the periphery of a photograph, to change its aspect ratio, or to improve the overall composition.

In telephoto photography, most commonly in avian and aviation photography, an image is cropped to magnify the primary subject and further reduce the angle of view—when a lens of sufficient focal length to achieve the desired magnification directly was not available. It is considered one of the few editing actions permissible in modern photojournalism along with tonal balance, color correction and sharpening. A cropping made by trimming off the top and bottom margins of a photograph, or a film, produces a view that mimics the panoramic format (in photography) or the widescreen format in cinematography and broadcasting. Neither of these formats is cropped as such, but rather they are products of highly specialized optical configurations and camera designs.

Graphic examples (photography) 
Cropping in order to emphasize the subject:

Cropping in order to remove unwanted details/objects:

Crop marks

To assist in precise cropping of a printed image, crop marks may be printed at the four corners of the image, just outside the central area to be retained:    at the top left corner,    at the top right corner,    at the bottom left corner, and    at the bottom right corner. The paper or paperboard on which the image is printed can then be cut on each sid so that the crop marks are removed.

In Unicode, the crop marks are represented by:
 
 
 
 

Crop marks are useful for cropping images printed with bleed, and more generally when the position of an image on the sheet it will be printed on is not precisely known in advance.

In cinematography and broadcasting 

In certain circumstances, film footage may be cropped to change it from one aspect ratio to another, without stretching the image or filling the blank spaces with letterbox bars (fig. 2).

Concerns about aspect ratios are a major issue in filmmaking. Rather than cropping, the cinematographer usually uses mattes to increase the latitude for alternative aspect ratios in projection and broadcast. Anamorphic optics (such as Panavision  lenses) produce a full-frame, horizontally compressed image from which broadcasters and projectionists can matte a number of alternative aspect ratios without cropping relevant image detail. Without this, widescreen reproduction, especially for television broadcasting, is dependent upon a variety of soft matting techniques such as letterboxing, which involves varying degrees of image cropping (see figures 2, 3 and 4).

Since the advent of widescreen television, a similar process removes large chunks from the top & bottom to make a standard 4:3 image fit a 16:9 one, losing 25 percent of the original image. Another option is a process called pillarboxing, where black bands are placed down the sides of the screen, allowing the original image to be shown full-frame within the wider aspect ratio (fig. 6).

Additional methods 
Various methods may be used following cropping or may be used on the original image.
 Vignetting is the accentuation of the central portion of an image by blurring, darkening, lightening, or desaturation of peripheral portions of the image
 The use of nonrectangular mat or picture frame may be used for selection of portions of a larger image

Digital images 

It is not possible to "uncrop" a cropped digital image unless the original still exists or undo information exists: if an image is cropped and saved (without undo information), it cannot be recovered without the original.

However, using texture synthesis, it is possible to artificially add a band around an image, synthetically "uncropping" it. This is effective if the band smoothly blends with the existing image, which is relatively easy if the edge of the image has low detail or is a chaotic natural pattern such as sky or grass, but does not work if discernible objects are cut off at the boundary, such as half a car. An uncrop plug-in exists for the GIMP image editor.

See also

References 

Film and video technology
Artistic techniques
Photographic techniques
Composition in visual art